The Ministry of Labour, Employment and Social Security is a government ministry of Nepal that governs the development policies of labour and employment in the country.

History
The ministry was formed in 1981 as the Ministry of Labour and Social Welfare.In 1995 and 2000, the portfolio was adjusted making it first the Ministry of Labour and later the Ministry of Labour and Transport Management. In 2002, the ministry was restructured resulting in a new name: Ministry of Labour and Employment. In 2018, under the second Oli cabinet, the portfolio was again adjusted twice: First, it was renamed as to being the Ministry of Labor, Employment, Women and Senior Citizens but in March 2018, the ministry was again divided to create both, the Ministry of Labor and Employment and the Ministry of Women, Children and Senior Citizen.

Objectives

Development of Pure Industrial Relationship
Ending Unemployment and Development of Productive and Qualitative Employment System
Child Labour Alleviation
Development of Safety, Managed and help based transportation system

Organisational structure
Two departments serve under the ministry to facilitate and implement its work:
 Department of Labour
Department of Foreign Employment

Furthermore, several Organizations also work under and with the ministry:
 Foreign Employment Promotion Board
 Vocational and Skill Development Centre

Former Ministers of Labour and Employment
This is a list of all Ministers of Labour and Employment since the Nepalese Constituent Assembly election in 2013:

References

Labour and Employment
Nepal
1981 establishments in Nepal